The 2018 OneMain Financial 200 was the 10th stock car race of the 2018 NASCAR Xfinity Series season and the 37th iteration of the event. The race was held on Saturday, May 5, 2018, in Dover, Delaware at Dover International Speedway, a 1 mile (1.6 km) oval-shaped permanent racetrack. The race took the scheduled 200 laps to complete. At race's end, Justin Allgaier of JR Motorsports would hold off his teammate Elliott Sadler in the closing laps to win his sixth career NASCAR Xfinity Series win and his first of the season. Allgaier would also win an extra $100,000 for winning a Dash 4 Cash event. To fill out the podium, Daniel Hemric of Richard Childress Racing would finish third.

Background 

Dover International Speedway is an oval race track in Dover, Delaware, United States that has held at least two NASCAR races since it opened in 1969. In addition to NASCAR, the track also hosted USAC and the NTT IndyCar Series. The track features one layout, a 1 mile (1.6 km) concrete oval, with 24° banking in the turns and 9° banking on the straights. The speedway is owned and operated by Dover Motorsports.

The track, nicknamed "The Monster Mile", was built in 1969 by Melvin Joseph of Melvin L. Joseph Construction Company, Inc., with an asphalt surface, but was replaced with concrete in 1995. Six years later in 2001, the track's capacity moved to 135,000 seats, making the track have the largest capacity of sports venue in the mid-Atlantic. In 2002, the name changed to Dover International Speedway from Dover Downs International Speedway after Dover Downs Gaming and Entertainment split, making Dover Motorsports. From 2007 to 2009, the speedway worked on an improvement project called "The Monster Makeover", which expanded facilities at the track and beautified the track. After the 2014 season, the track's capacity was reduced to 95,500 seats.

Entry list 

*Harmon would participate in both the Happy Hour and qualifying sessions, but would be replaced by Cody Ware in the first practice session. However, Harmon would replace Ware after Ware crashed in the session.

Practice

First practice 
The first practice session would occur on Friday, May 4, at 9:35 AM EST and would last for 50 minutes.

Second and final practice 
The second and final practice session, sometimes referred to as Happy Hour, would occur on Friday, May 4, at 2:05 PM EST and would last for 45 minutes.

Qualifying 
Qualifying would occur on Saturday, May 5, at 9:35 AM EST. Since Dover International Speedway is under 2 miles (3.2 km), the qualifying system was a multi-car system that included three rounds. The first round was 15 minutes, where every driver would be able to set a lap within the 15 minutes. Then, the second round would consist of the fastest 24 cars in Round 1, and drivers would have 10 minutes to set a lap. Round 3 consisted of the fastest 12 drivers from Round 2, and the drivers would have 5 minutes to set a time. Whoever was fastest in Round 3 would win the pole.

Nine drivers did not set a lap due to not passing inspection in time before the qualifying session.

Full qualifying results

Race results 
Stage 1 Laps: 45

Stage 2 Laps: 45

Stage 3 Laps: 110

References 

2018 NASCAR Xfinity Series
NASCAR races at Dover Motor Speedway
May 2018 sports events in the United States
2018 in sports in Delaware